The following is an episode list for ABC's 1957 comedic Western television series, Maverick, created by Roy Huggins and starring James Garner, Jack Kelly, Roger Moore, and Robert Colbert as Bret, Bart, Beau, and Brent Maverick respectively.   Unusually for an American television program, Maverick's main cast varied episodically between Garner, Kelly, Moore or Colbert. As such, the starring cast for each episode is listed below alongside other details. Most episodes feature only one of the lead characters named Maverick, and never more than two—-and in two-Maverick episodes, one of the Mavericks is always Bart, who appears in all five seasons from 1957 to 1962. James Garner stars as Bret Maverick in the first three seasons, and Roger Moore and Robert Colbert portray Beau and Brent Maverick in the fourth season.

Cast
Bret Maverick: James Garner (1957-1960)
Bart Maverick: Jack Kelly (1957-1962)
Beau Maverick: Roger Moore (1960-1961)
Brent Maverick: Robert Colbert (1961)

Series overview

Episodes

Season 1 (1957–1958)
James Garner as Bret Maverick is the sole star for the first seven episodes. With episode eight, he's joined by Jack Kelly as his brother Bart Maverick, brought in because it took a week and a day to make each episode, in which case the series would run out of episodes before the end of the season. The solution was to have two crews working simultaneously. From that point on, Garner and Kelly alternate leads more or less from week to week, occasionally appearing together in the same episode. Intermittently recurring characters include rival gamblers/operators Samantha Crawford (Diane Brewster), Dandy Jim Buckley (Efrem Zimbalist Jr.) and Big Mike McComb (Leo Gordon). The entire first season was released by Warner Bros. on DVD in mid-2012.

Season 2 (1958–1959)
Garner and Kelly continue as alternating leads, with the odd 'team-up' episode. Semi-regulars Samatha Crawford (Diane Brewster) and Dandy Jim Buckley (Efrem Zimbalist Jr.) exit partway through the season; new semi-regulars include Cindy Lou Brown (Arlene Howell) and Gentleman Jack Darby (Richard Long). Big Mike McComb (Leo Gordon) also returns from the first season.

{{Episode table
 |background=#304789
 |overall=10
 |series=10
 |title=35
 |Aux3=25
 |Aux3T=Featured character(s)
 |airdate=20
 |episodes=

{{Episode list
| EpisodeNumber       = 43
| EpisodeNumber2      = 16
| Title               = Gun-Shy 
| Aux3                = Bret
| OriginalAirDate     = 
| ShortSummary        = Bret is hot on the trail of half a million dollars' worth of buried Confederate gold, but is constantly thwarted by a square-jawed, upstanding lawman. This is Maverick'''s Gunsmoke spoof, with Ben Gage as Marshal Mort Dooley (a comical version of Marshal Matt Dillon) and Walker Edmiston as the Chester character. There's also a brief, veiled dig at Have Gun Will Travel. Also featuring Andra Martin as the leading lady, Marshall Kent as "Doc", Reginald Owen as rival con man Freddie Wilkins, and Gage Clarke as Badger, an amusing encyclopedia salesman. Dooley mentions the unseen "Hognose Hughes", a character seen in "The Jail At Junction Flats" and played by Bonanza's Dan Blocker in that episode. Written by Marion Hargrove and directed by Leslie H. Martinson. 
}}

}}

Season 3 (1959–1960)
Writer/creator Roy Huggins leaves the show.  Garner and Kelly remain the leads. Of the recurring characters, only Gentleman Jack Darby returns for season 3, and only for one episode.  Three new characters, obvious replacements for Dandy Jim Buckley and Samantha Crawford, are seen, but only for two episodes each:  Edward Ashley's impeccably dressed and outwardly charming gambler Nobby Ned Wingate (also spelled "Wyngate"); Kathleen Crowley's cheerful, scheming gold-digger Melanie Blake; and Mona Freeman's determined but slightly psychotic seeming operator Modesty Blaine.

{{Episode table
 |background=#293678
 |overall=10
 |series=10
 |title=35
 |Aux3=25
 |Aux3T=Featured character(s)
 |airdate=20
 |episodes=

{{Episode list
| EpisodeNumber       = 78
| EpisodeNumber2      = 25
| Title               = The Misfortune Teller 
| Aux3                = Bret, Melanie Blake
| OriginalAirDate     = 
| ShortSummary        = Bret rides in to a small Wyoming town where he's never been before, and is immediately thrown into jail, accused of having killed the town's mayor.  The episode features another spoof of Gunsmoke's Marshal Matt Dillon with Ben Gage; a turn by Alan Mowbray as Bret's astrology and numerology obsessed lawyer; and Kathleen Crowley in her phenomenally seductive Mae West-like role of Melanie Blake, last seen in "Maverick Springs" (which is briefly discussed). Half a century later, Kathleen Crowley was the one actress from the series that Garner singled out in his autobiography "The Garner Files" to express his admiration for her acting ability at length. Written by Leo Townsend and directed by Arthur Lubin.
}}

}}

Season 4 (1960–1961)
Starring Jack Kelly and Roger Moore. Jack Kelly stays on as Bart Maverick, who now alternates the lead with Roger Moore as cousin Beau Maverick. Kelly and Moore are also featured in three two-cousin episodes. With the exception of a single two-brother episode held over from the third season, James Garner is no longer a part of the show.  After the season's twenty-fifth episode, Moore also leaves.  Toward the end of the season, Moore is briefly replaced by Garner lookalike Robert Colbert as Bart's brother Brent Maverick, who typically dresses in Bret Maverick's most frequent costume.

The episode "Bolt from the Blue" starring Roger Moore was written and directed by Robert Altman. Peter Breck would make one appearance as Doc Holliday in this season, becoming a semi-regular in the series' final episodes.  All previous semi-regulars are dropped for this season, including the new characters (Modesty Blaine, Melanie Blake and Nobby Ned Wingate), just introduced in season 3.   Modesty would eventually return for one episode in season 5 – but played by Kathleen Crowley, who had previously portrayed Melanie Blake.

Season 5 (1961–1962)
Jack Kelly becomes the sole star of new Maverick'' offerings. At one point, the thirteen new episodes shot for the season were to consist of the first three episodes starring both Bart and Brent (played by Robert Colbert) to open the season then five more alternating solo episodes for each, to be continuously alternated with reruns of some of James Garner's earlier shows from the first two seasons (including  "The Saga of Waco Williams" and "Shady Deal at Sunny Acres"), but Kelly wound up doing the thirteen new episodes without Colbert. During Kelly's new installments, neither Bret, Beau, nor Brent are ever mentioned; the series' new episodes had finally reverted to the original single-Maverick formula observed for the initial seven episodes, only with Kelly as Maverick instead of Garner. However, Garner's name once again appears in the weekly series opening credits before all the newly produced shows, albeit now with second billing under Kelly (Ed Reimers announces "Maverick! Starring Jack Kelly and James Garner!" each week over the opening credits).

The theme song for this season is souped up with a brisker pace, more flamboyant instrumentation, and sound effects such as the riverboat's ringing bell.

Peter Breck returns as Doc Holliday, becoming a semi-regular in these final episodes.  He appears in 4 of the 13 episodes produced for this season, including the series finale. Mike Road appears as "Pearly" Gates in two episodes, alongside Kathleen Crowley as Gates' companion Marla.  Crowley also appears in the final episode as Modesty Blaine, a role played twice in the third season by Mona Freeman.

References

External links
 
 
 
 Maverick TV western 1957–62
 Roy Huggins' Archive of American Television Interview
 Stephen J. Cannell's Archive of American Television Interview
 Museum of Broadcast Communications: Maverick
 James Garner interview in the Archive of American Television
 James Garner Interview on the Charlie Rose Show

Maverick
Lists of American Western (genre) television series episodes
Maverick (TV series)